Krasny is a rural locality (a settlement) in Alexandrovskoye Rural Settlement, Talovsky District, Voronezh Oblast, Russia. The population was 277 as of 2010. There are 2 streets.

Geography 
It is located 10 km NNE from Talovaya.

References 

Rural localities in Talovsky District